Diaphania beckeri is a moth in the family Crambidae. It was described by Jose A. Clavuo-A. and Eugene G. Munroe in 1996. It is found in Central America and South America.

References

Moths described in 1996
Diaphania